Mordechai Ish-Shalom, (1902–1991), was an Israeli politician and labor leader. He was the Mayor of West Jerusalem from 1959 to 1965.

Biography
Mordechai Ish-Shalom was born in Lithuania during the reign of the Russian Empire. He immigrated to Mandate Palestine in 1923. His labor career began in the Stonecutters' Union in 1935; he then rose through the ranks of the Histadrut, the Israeli trade union congress.

In 1964, Ish-Shalom established an interdisciplinary professional team to plan the modernization of Jerusalem.

In the 1970s, he was instrumental in the development of Kiryat Wolfson, a five-tower high-rise project overlooking Sacher Park.

Ish-Shalom died on 21 February 1991.

Notes

References

Mayors of Jerusalem
1902 births
1991 deaths
Lithuanian Jews
Lithuanian emigrants to Mandatory Palestine
Jews in Mandatory Palestine
Date of birth missing
Mandatory Palestine people of Lithuanian-Jewish descent